The 2018 Singapore Cup (also known as the RHB Singapore Cup for sponsorship reasons) is the 21st edition of Singapore's annual premier club football knock-out tournament organised by the Football Association of Singapore.

The draw was held on 24 June 2018.

Quarter-finals

DPMM won 5–2 on aggregate.

Balestier Khalsa won 1–0 on aggregate.

Albirex Niigata won 3–0 on aggregate.

Home United won 4–3 on aggregate.

Semi-finals 

Albirex Niigata won 4–2 on aggregate.

DPMM won 4–2 on aggregate.

3rd and 4th Placing

Final

Season statistics

Top scorers

References

Singapore Cup seasons
Singapore